Leete may refer to:

People with the surname
 Alfred Leete, graphic artist
 Andrew Leete Stone, author and religious figure
 Bernard Leete, aviator
 Bill Leete, sportsman
 Harry Rickards, performer whose birth name was Henry Leete
 William Leete, colonial-era governor
 William Leete Stone, Sr.  (20 April 1792 – 15 August 1844), journalist and publisher
 William Leete Stone, Jr. (4 April 1835 – 11 June 1908 ), journalist and historian

Other uses
 the Leete Limestone, a geologic formation
 the Pelatiah Leete House, a historic building
 Leeteville, an inactive postal district once found in Ragtown, Nevada
 Doctor Leete, a character in the 1888 science-fiction novel Looking Backward
 In medieval England, an alternate spelling of a court leet
 An alternate spelling of leat